Altenwalde is a village in the town of Cuxhaven in Lower Saxony.

Altenwalde was first mentioned in 1282 as Wolde.

On July 1, 1972, Altenwalde was incorporated into Cuxhaven.

Twin towns
Saint-Avé, France

References

Cuxhaven (district)
Villages in Lower Saxony